Górne may refer to the following places:
Górne, Lublin Voivodeship (east Poland)
Górne, Warmian-Masurian Voivodeship (north Poland)
Górne, West Pomeranian Voivodeship (north-west Poland)